Donatien-Marie-Joseph de Vimeur, vicomte de Rochambeau (7 April 1755 – 20 October 1813) was a French military commander. He was the son of Jean-Baptiste Donatien de Vimeur, comte de Rochambeau.

Biography 

He served in the American Revolutionary War as an aide-de-camp to his father, spending the winter of 1781–1782 in quarters at Williamsburg, Virginia. In the 1790s, he participated in an unsuccessful campaign to re-establish French authority in Martinique and Saint-Domingue. Rochambeau was later assigned to the French Revolutionary Army in the Italian Peninsula, and was appointed to the military command of the Ligurian Republic.

In 1802, he was appointed to lead an expeditionary force against Saint-Domingue (Haiti) after General Charles Leclerc's death. His remit was to restore French control of their rebellious colony, by any means. Historians of the Haitian Revolution credit his brutal tactics for uniting black and gens de couleur soldiers against the French. After Rochambeau surrendered to the rebel general Jean-Jacques Dessalines in November 1803, the former French colony declared its independence as Haïti, the second independent state in the Americas. In the process, Dessalines became arguably the most successful military commander in the struggle against Napoleonic France.

At the surrender of Cap Français, Rochambeau was captured aboard the frigate Surveillante by a British squadron under the command of Captain John Loring and returned to England as a prisoner on parole, where he remained interned for almost nine years.

He was exchanged in 1811, and returned to the family château, where he resumed the work of classifying the family's growing collection of maps, which his father had begun. He also enriched the collections with new acquisitions, in particular ones contributed by the military campaigns of his son, Auguste-Philippe Donatien de Vimeur, who served as the aide-de-camp for Joachim Murat and was with Murat's cavalry in the Russian campaign in 1812.

He was mortally wounded in the Battle of Nations, and died three days later at Leipzig, at the age of 58.

In addition to his legitimate son, Vimeur was survived by an illegitimate son, Lewis Warrington, conceived in Williamsburg, Virginia, when Vimeur was a young officer serving with his father in America during the Revolutionary War.

Motto and coat of arms

Sources

References

External links
 A Guide to the Donatien Marie Joseph de Vimeur Rochambeau Papers
 The Louverture Project

French people of the American Revolution
People of the Haitian Revolution
1755 births
1813 deaths
Military personnel from Paris
Viscounts of France
Names inscribed under the Arc de Triomphe
Governors of Saint-Domingue
1800s in Guadeloupe
18th-century French military personnel
19th-century French military personnel
French Governors of Martinique
Governors general of the French Antilles
French commanders of the Napoleonic Wars
French military personnel killed in the Napoleonic Wars